Breakfast-A-Go-Go may refer to:
 Fredd Bear's Breakfast-A-Go-Go (1969 – 1972)
 Breakfast-A-Go-Go (1971), renaming of Good Morning!!! (Australian show)